Erna Maisack (born 13 October 1941) is a German sprinter. She competed in the women's 400 metres at the 1964 Summer Olympics.

References

1941 births
Living people
Athletes (track and field) at the 1964 Summer Olympics
German female sprinters
Olympic athletes of the United Team of Germany
Place of birth missing (living people)
Olympic female sprinters